Oswin Harvard Gibbs-Smith, CBE (15 November 1901 – 26 September 1969) was Dean of Winchester in the third quarter of the 20th century.

Early life and education
Gibbs-Smith was born on 15 November 1901. He was educated at King's College School, Cambridge, and then Westminster School, a public school within the precincts of Westminster Abbey, London. He studied at King's College, Cambridge and at Clare College, Cambridge. He trained for Holy Orders at Cuddesdon College, an Anglo-Catholic theological college.

Ordained ministry
Gibbs-Smith was ordained in the Church of England as a deacon in 1924 and as a priest in 1925. He then spent a short spell as an Assistant Master at Harrow School. He began his ecclesiastical career with a curacy at St Margaret's Church, Ilkley. Following this he was Vicar of John Keble Church, Mill Hill, and Rector of Christ Church, Marylebone, from 1941 to 1948. He was the Archdeacon of London and a Canon Residentiary of St Paul's Cathedral between 1947 and 1961. He served as Dean of Winchester from 1961 to 1969.

Personal life
In 1949, Gibbs-Smith married Nora Gregg. Together they had two children: one son and one daughter.

Honours
In 1953, Gibbs-Smith was made a Freeman of the City of London. In the 1961 Queen's Birthday Honours, he was appointed a Commander of the Order of the Bath (CBE).

References

External links
 

1901 births
People educated at Westminster School, London
Alumni of Clare College, Cambridge
Archdeacons of London
Commanders of the Order of the British Empire
Deans of Winchester
1969 deaths
Alumni of King's College, Cambridge
Alumni of Cuddesdon College